Arnoldus Johannes Eymer (1803, Amsterdam1863, Haarlem), was a painter, draftsman, lithographer and watercolourist from the Northern Netherlands.

Biography
According to the RKD he was born in Amsterdam, where he first learned and practised the broker trade. In his spare time he took up painting until 1834, when he decided to concentrate on painting. Eymer was a pupil of Cornelis Steffelaar and worked with Jan van Ravenswaay and later became the father of the painter L.J. Eymer.  He made a grand tour from 1835 to 1836 to Bad Bentheim and the Harz Mountains in Germany, where he produced landscape paintings. After his tour Eymer moved to Haarlem, where he lived until 1863 and where his works are in the collections of the Frans Hals Museum and the Teylers Museum.

References

Arnoldus Johannes Eymer on Artnet

1803 births
1863 deaths
19th-century Dutch painters
Dutch male painters
Painters from Amsterdam
19th-century Dutch male artists